The iron mines of Torre de Moncorvo are located in the municipality of Torre de Moncorvo, Portugal.

History 
The mines were the subject of primitive exploitation from the Iron Age. to the end of the 18th century. 

The first experience of proto-industrial exploration took place in the 1790s and, from the 1870s on, interest in mining concessions in Moncorvo was renewed, with 35 concessions. In 1897 most of the concessions were acquired by the Syndicat Franco-Iberique Company, which began "methodical and systematic prospecting work with 1396 chemical analyses".

Between 1930 and 1934, galleries were opened in Mua, and 15,279 tons of ore were extracted, according to the Minas Bulletin. The exploration and exploration work of the Companhia Mineira de Moncorvo continued until 1942. After World War II the concessions of this German company were made by the Portuguese Government and, from 1957, that Company was managed by Exploration & Bergba of the Thyssen group, assuming the designation of Minacorvo, Lda.

That year the pilot wash was built and, in 1976, Minacorvo was dissolved and its concessions were integrated into Ferrominas SARL, then Ferrominas EP, ending with the creation of EDM EP, from 1986.

Between 1951 and 1976 1,796,535 tonnes of iron ore from Moncorvo were exported.

Torre de Moncorvo iron mines were the largest employer in the region in the 1950s, employing 1,500 miners.

Ore exploration was suspended in 1983, with the bankruptcy of Ferrominas, EP.

It is considered to be one of the largest iron ore deposits in Europe.

Reactivation 
The torre de Moncorvo iron mines had no activity for 37 after the bankruptcy of Ferrominas, EP.

A new concession was handed over to Aethel Mining headed by Ricardo Santos Silva in 2016

Exploration activities began on 19 June 2020 and Aethel Mining estimates that it will extract around 300 000 tonnes of iron ore by the end of 2020.

References 

Mines in Portugal